Daniel Sheffer (May 24, 1783 – February 16, 1880) was a Democratic member of the U.S. House of Representatives from Pennsylvania.

Sheffer was born in York, Pennsylvania.  He attended the common schools and Harvard University.  He studied medicine in Philadelphia and commenced practice at York Springs, Pennsylvania.  He was associate judge of Adams County, Pennsylvania, from 1813 to 1837.

Sheffer was elected as a Democrat to the Twenty-fifth Congress.  He was an unsuccessful candidate for reelection in 1838 to the Twenty-sixth Congress.  He resumed the practice of his profession and was a delegate to the 1848 Democratic National Convention.  He died in 1880 at York Springs, where he was interred in the Old Lutheran Cemetery.

Sources

The Political Graveyard

External links

 

1783 births
1880 deaths
Politicians from York, Pennsylvania
Pennsylvania state court judges
Harvard University alumni
Democratic Party members of the United States House of Representatives from Pennsylvania
19th-century American politicians
19th-century American judges